Abelson, originating from both Swedish and Yiddish, and derived from the name Abel, is the surname of:

 Alan Abelson (1925–2013), American journalist
 Dave Abelson (born 1975), Canadian tennis player
 Evelyn Abelson (1886–1967), English artist
 Hal Abelson, American computer scientist
 Hope Abelson (1910-2006), American artist and arts philanthropist
 John Abelson (born 1939), American biochemist
 Matthew Abelson, American musician
 Neva Abelson (1910–2000), American physician
 Philip Abelson (1913–2004), American nuclear physicist
 Raziel Abelson (1921–2017), American philosopher
 Robert Abelson (1928–2005), American political scientist
 Sophie Abelson, an English stage and television actress
 Peter Abelsson (born 1977), Swedish football (soccer) player

See also
 Abelsonite, the mineral
 Abelson murine leukemia virus, also known as "Abelson's virus"
 Abelson's paradox
 Ableson (a surname)